

Oman
 Mombasa – Nasr ibn Abdallah al-Mazru‘i, Wali of Mombasa (1698–1728)

Portugal
 Angola – 
 António de Saldanha de Albuquerque, Governor of Angola (1709–1713)
 João Manuel de Noronha, Governor of Angola (1713–1717)
 Macau – Antonio de Sequeira de Noronha, Governor of Macau (1711–1714)

Great Britain
 Massachusetts – Joseph Dudley, Governor of Massachusetts Bay Colony (1702–1715)

Colonial governors
Colonial governors
1713